Cola, Candy, Chocolate is a 1979 West German sex comedy film directed by Sigi Rothemund and starring Olivia Pascal, Philippe Ricci and .

Cast
 Olivia Pascal as Gaby 
 Philippe Ricci as Dr. Andreas Witzig 
 Christine Zierl as Christine 
 David Auker as Johnny Smith 
 Ursula Buchfellner as Carmela 
 Roland Astor as Roland 
 Ike Lozada as Hotelchef Juanto 
 Ruben Tizon as Bischof 
 Herbert Fux as Pfarrer Herbert 
 Mickey as Schimpanse Jimmy

References

Bibliography
 Roman Schliesser & Leo Moser. Die Supernase: Karl Spiehs und seine Filme. Ueberreuter, 2006.

External links 
 

1979 films
1970s sex comedy films
German sex comedy films
West German films
1970s German-language films
Films directed by Sigi Rothemund
Films scored by Gerhard Heinz
Films set in the Philippines
Films set in Munich
Films about vacationing
1979 comedy films
1970s German films